Milton of Crathes railway station is located at Milton of Crathes, three miles east of Banchory, Royal Deeside, Aberdeenshire, Scotland, United Kingdom.

Crathes (Castle) Station
In 1863 Crathes Castle was renamed Crathes and became a public railway station, a role it retained until the closure of the railway line in 1966 due to the famous Beeching cuts. The Crathes station building and replica of the original signal box were placed on the market during 2021 and sold to new owners.

Milton of Crathes Station
Milton of Crathes station is the headquarters of the Royal Deeside Railway Preservation Society (RDRPS).  The station is currently the first station of the rebuilt Royal Deeside Railway which will eventually run for over two miles west into the town of Banchory. The station itself consists of a single platform and two tracks (which form a locomotive run-round loop and headshunts). The station was officially opened on 14 April 2007 by Aberdeenshire Provost Raymond Bisset.

At the east end of the station, the former Oldmeldrum station building has been re-erected and restored by the volunteers of the RDRPS. The station building itself now houses a museum with memorabilia and a ticket office which is also run by a set of volunteers.

The station also has numerous parking spaces available, picnic spots next to the main line as well as fantastic space to observe and capture train operations. 

Currently all passenger services always start here and are operated using a selection of rolling stock including British Rail Class 03 diesel shunters, three British Rail Mark 2 coaches in BR Crimson and Cream livery and the carriages which form the British Rail BEMU "Gemini" Battery Railcar.  Various items of rolling stock are either stored at the station or elsewhere along the railway line.

Milton of Crathes is also home to the former Aberdeen Gas Works steam locomotive: 0-4-0 "Bon Accord", which completed her 10-year overhaul in 2019 and is currently used to operate the steam service. 

Attractions: Crathes Castle (opposite), various heritage rolling stock items.

References

External links
Website of the Royal Deeside Railway Preservation Society
RAILSCOT on Deeside Railway

Heritage railway stations in Aberdeenshire
Railway stations in Great Britain opened in 1853
Railway stations in Great Britain closed in 1966
Railway stations built for UK heritage railways
1853 establishments in Scotland
1966 disestablishments in Scotland
Railway stations opened in 2007